Trita is a district of Luya Province in the Amazonas Region in Peru. Trita offers several attractive places for tourists such as the ruins of the Chachapoya culture.

As typical meals the Candy stick is known with Popes and the Purtumote between others.

The district is bordered to the north by the Lámud District and to the south by the Luya District.

Districts of the Luya Province
Districts of the Amazonas Region